General Ronald Wilburn Yates (born October 3, 1938) served as Commander, Air Force Materiel Command, Wright-Patterson Air Force Base, Ohio.  As AFMC Commander, Yates was responsible for research, development, test, acquisition and logistics support for the Air Force from 18 specialized centers and 116,000 military and civilian employees around the world.

Background
Yates graduated from the United States Air Force Academy in 1960. He has served as a test pilot, flying a variety of modified fighter aircraft, as program manager for a variety of weapon systems, and as commander of a test wing. General Yates also served as commander of Air Force Systems Command. He is a command test pilot with more than 4,400 flying hours, and flew 100 combat missions in Southeast Asia. In March 1994 he was inducted into the AFMC Order of the Sword.  He retired from active duty on July 1, 1995.

Education
1960 Bachelor of Science degree in military science, United States Air Force Academy, Colorado Springs, Colorado
1964 Squadron Officer School, Maxwell AFB, Alabama
1969 Aerospace Research Pilot School, Edwards Air Force Base, California
1970 Master of Science degree in systems management, University of Southern California
1970 Air Command and Staff College, Maxwell AFB, Alabama
1973 Defense Systems Management College, Fort Belvoir, Virginia
1977 Industrial College of the Armed Forces, Fort Lesley J. McNair, Washington, D.C.

Assignments
June 1960 - November 1962, student, aviation training, Spence AB, Georgia, Webb AFB and Perrin AFB, Texas
December 1962 - June 1964, pilot, 68th Fighter Interceptor Squadron, Itazuke Air Base, Japan
June 1964 - June 1966, pilot, 509th Fighter Interceptor Squadron, Clark AB, Philippines
July 1966 - December 1970, student, test pilot, Aerospace Research Pilot School; then Chief, Aerospace Research Pilot Branch, Aerospace Research Pilot School, Edwards AFB, California
January 1971 - January 1973, Director, Senior Officer Management, Headquarters Air Force Systems Command, Andrews AFB, Maryland
January 1973 - July 1973, student, Defense Systems Management College, Fort Belvoir, Virginia
July 1973 - August 1976, Director, Development Test, A-10 System Program Office, Aeronautical Systems Division, Wright-Patterson AFB, Ohio
August 1976 - June 1977, student, Industrial College of the Armed Forces, Fort Lesley J. McNair, Washington, D.C.
July 1977 - March 1979, program element monitor, F-16 program, Office of the Deputy Chief of Staff for Research and Development, Headquarters U.S. Air Force, Washington, D.C.
April 1979 - June 1980, Deputy Program Director, F-15 program, Aeronautical Systems Division, Wright-Patterson AFB, Ohio
July 1980 - July 1981, Program Director, F-15 program, Aeronautical Systems Division, Wright-Patterson AFB, Ohio
July 1981 - April 1983, Commander, 4950th Test Wing, Wright-Patterson AFB, Ohio
April 1983 - August 1983, Director, tactical systems, Aeronautical Systems Division, Wright-Patterson AFB, Ohio
August 1983 - July 1986, System Program Director, F-16 System Program Office, Aeronautical Systems Division, Wright-Patterson AFB, Ohio
July 1986 - January 1989, Director, Tactical Programs, Office of the Secretary of the Air Force for Acquisition, Washington, D.C.
January 1989 - April 1990, Principal Deputy, Office of the Assistant Secretary of the Air Force for Acquisition, Washington, D.C.
April 1990 - June 1992, Commander, Air Force Systems Command, Andrews AFB, Maryland
July 1992 - July 1995, Commander, Air Force Materiel Command, Wright-Patterson AFB, Ohio

Flight information
Rating: Command pilot, test pilot
Flight hours: More than 4,400
Aircraft flown: More than 50 aircraft types

Awards and decorations
  Air Force Distinguished Service Medal
  Legion of Merit with oak leaf cluster
  Distinguished Flying Cross
  Meritorious Service Medal with two oak leaf clusters
  Air Medal with three oak leaf clusters
  Air Force Commendation Medal with two oak leaf clusters
  Vietnam Service Medal with three bronze stars
  Republic of Vietnam Gallantry Cross with Palm
  Republic of Vietnam Campaign Medal

References

External links

1938 births
Living people
United States Air Force generals
United States Air Force Academy alumni
Recipients of the Legion of Merit
Recipients of the Distinguished Flying Cross (United States)
United States Air Force personnel of the Vietnam War
U.S. Air Force Test Pilot School alumni
Recipients of the Air Force Distinguished Service Medal
Recipients of the Air Medal
American test pilots
Recipients of the Order of the Sword (United States)